Kevin Nealon (born November 18, 1953) is an American comedian and actor. Nealon first gained widespread attention during his tenure as a cast member on the NBC sketch comedy series Saturday Night Live from 1986 to 1995, where he anchored the show's news parody segment Weekend Update. After leaving SNL, he acted in several of the Happy Madison films, played Doug Wilson on the Showtime series Weeds, and provided the voice of the title character, Glenn Martin, on Glenn Martin, DDS.

Early life and education
Nealon was born on November 18, 1953, in St. Louis, Missouri, one of five children of Kathleen M. (née Kimball; 1928–2020) and Emmett F. Nealon (1925–2018), an aircraft company executive. A few months after he was born, the family moved to Bridgeport, Connecticut; when he was six, they moved to Germany for four years.  He is of Irish descent and was raised Catholic. He graduated from St. Joseph High School in Trumbull, Connecticut, in 1971 and earned a bachelor's degree in marketing from Sacred Heart University. He then took night courses at Fairfield University, where he played quarterback on the football team.

Career
Nealon played guitar in bands during high school and gravitated to comedy in college. In 1977, he moved to San Diego and then to Los Angeles, where he learned his craft at the Improv while tending bar there for a living. He had been doing stand-up for six years when he made his network television debut on The Tonight Show Starring Johnny Carson in 1984. He later became a regular there and on Late Night with David Letterman.

In 1986, Saturday Night Live recruited his friend Dana Carvey, and Carvey, in turn, recommended Nealon. Both joined the cast that year, and Nealon became a full-time performer in the 1987–1988 season, and remained for nine seasons. Nealon's SNL characters include Mr. Subliminal (which also became known as the "Subliminal Editorial" when Nealon was promoted to Weekend Update anchorman), Frank Gannon, P.I.P.I. (for Politically Incorrect Private Investigator), Bob Waltman (a male Barbara Walters), and Franz (of Hans and Franz) along with Carvey. He also anchored Weekend Update from 1991 to 1994. He stayed on SNL for one more season and left in 1995, after a then-record nine seasons. (His record was later surpassed by Tim Meadows, Darrell Hammond, and Kenan Thompson.)

In 1991, he had his first major film role, as boyfriend Tony Boer in All I Want for Christmas. Other films in which he has since appeared include Happy Gilmore, The Wedding Singer, Anger Management, Little Nicky, Just Go with It, Daddy Day Care, Good Boy!, and Aliens in the Attic (2009). He has a part in many of Adam Sandler's Happy Madison films, including Grandma's Boy (2006), You Don't Mess with the Zohan (2008), and Father of the Year (2018), and made a cameo appearance in the 2008 film Get Smart.
 
In the mid-1990s, Nealon played himself in three episodes of The Larry Sanders Show. The most popular episode was titled "The New Writer" when he starts hanging around the office so much that Hank (played by actor Jeffrey Tambor) is worried Nealon is trying to steal his job. Garry Shandling and Nealon had a close relationship. In 1994, Nealon hosted the 13-part series Amazing America on the Discovery Channel.

Nealon had a recurring television role on the 2002–06 CBS comedy Still Standing playing Ted Halverson, the Millers' competitive and religious neighbor. He also appeared as a patient in a mental institution on the first season of Monk. Nealon played Dr. Mark Crest in "Deja Vu", an episode of The Outer Limits television show. It first aired on July 9, 1999, during the fifth season. From 2005 to 2012, Nealon had an ongoing supporting role as Doug Wilson on the show Weeds on Showtime. In 2009–2011 he voiced the title character in Nick at Nite's animated series Glenn Martin, DDS.

In 2002, he hosted The Conspiracy Zone on The New TNN for 26 episodes plus an unaired pilot. In 2004, he hosted the first season of Poker Royale on the Game Show Network. Nealon also hosted several years of World's Funniest Commercials specials on TBS in the 2000s.

In 2008, he published a book chronicling his experiences during his wife's pregnancy, Yes, You're Pregnant, But What About Me?.

Starting in 2015, Nealon portrayed Captain Telstar in commercials for Charter Spectrum. From 2016 to 2020, he was a regular on the TV sitcom Man with a Plan,

Since 2017 he has also hosted a YouTube talk show called Hiking with Kevin where he hikes a trail with various celebrity guests; the idea came about when during a hike with Matthew Modine they ran out of breath, and Nealon thought it'd be funny to record their inability to talk. As of 2022, the show is on its fourth season with over 100 episodes. Nealon produces and edits the entire show by himself, recording simply using a selfie stick and a camera drone.

Personal life

Nealon was dating Jan Hooks when they were both hired by Saturday Night Live. In 1989 he married Linda Dupree, a model and stuntwoman; they divorced in 2002. During this time, Nealon, who has been a vegan since 1989, became active in the animal rights movement; he has supported PETA, the Amanda Foundation, Farm Sanctuary, the Washington Wildlife Alliance, The Ark Trust's Genesis Awards, and also Meat Out.

On September 3, 2005, he married Susan Yeagley in Bellagio, Lombardy, Italy. They have a son, Gable, born in 2007. They reside in Pacific Palisades, Los Angeles.

He is distantly related to Daniel Webster.

Nealon played rugby for Fairfield Yankees RFC.

On February 22, 2006, Nealon contributed an opinion article to The New York Times about having his phone tapped and his police records searched by Hollywood private investigator Anthony Pellicano, who was later convicted of crimes including racketeering and illegal wiretapping. It was also revealed in a separate court case later the same month that investigators working for the Ringling Bros. and Barnum & Bailey Circus may also have targeted Nealon for wiretapping in connection with his work for PETA. Nealon holds dual Irish and American citizenship.

Nealon is a fixture on the European melodic rock scene both as a fan, and as a benefactor; in 2019 he used his fame to organize a benefit for close friend and ailing rocker Tony Mills. All proceeds from the festival went towards Mills' medical expenses.

On May 15, 2022, Nealon was awarded a Doctorate of Humane Letters, Honoris Causa, by his alma mater, Sacred Heart University. Nealon also served as the convocation speaker for the graduating class of 2022.

Filmography

Film

Television

References

External links 
 
 

1953 births
Living people
20th-century American male actors
21st-century American male actors
American male comedians
American male film actors
American male television actors
American male voice actors
American sketch comedians
American stand-up comedians
American television writers
Male actors from Bridgeport, Connecticut
American male television writers
Poker commentators
Sacred Heart Pioneers football players
Sacred Heart University alumni
Fairfield University alumni
Screenwriters from Connecticut
20th-century American comedians
21st-century American comedians
American people of Irish descent
American expatriates in Germany